Alex Boisvert-Lacroix (born 8 April 1987) is a Canadian speed skater who is specialized in the sprint distances.

Career
Boisvert-Lacroix started his speed skating career as a short tracker and competed in his first World Cup in 2007. He switched from short track to long track speed skating in 2010. He won a bronze medal at the ISU World Cup in Calgary in November 2015 when he finished third in the 500m event. In December he won a silver medal when he finished second in the World Cup 500m event in Inzell.  Boisvert-Lacroix is coached by Gregor Jelonek.

2018 Olympics
After finishing in the top 5 in the 500 m event at the 2017–18 ISU Speed Skating World Cup, Boisvert-Lacroix pre-qualified for the 2018 Winter Olympics in Pyeongchang, South Korea.

Personal records

Source: SpeedskatingResults.com

References

External links
 

1987 births
Living people
Canadian male speed skaters
Sportspeople from Sherbrooke
Speed skaters at the 2018 Winter Olympics
Olympic speed skaters of Canada
World Single Distances Speed Skating Championships medalists
21st-century Canadian people